Vyacheslav Kononov was a Soviet sprint canoer who competed in the late 1960s. He won three medals in the K-2 10000 m event at the ICF Canoe Sprint World Championships, two golds (1970, 1971) and a bronze (1974).

References

Living people
Soviet male canoeists
Year of birth missing (living people)
ICF Canoe Sprint World Championships medalists in kayak